Limitation periods in Irish law are set out in a variety of statutes and in judicial decisions but primarily the limitations applying to civil actions are set out in the Statute of Limitations, 1957 and the Statute of Limitations (Amendment) Act, 1991.  These statutes impose a limit on the right of action so that after a prescribed period any action will be time barred.  A list of cause of actions affected are listed under part two of the Statute of Limitations 1957.

The statute of limitations in the Republic of Ireland depends on the type of legal case and also who is taking the case (the rules are different for children). The time period usually starts from the date of accrual of the cause of action or (if later) knowledge of the potential cause of action.

Limitation periods

Criminal cases 
 Summary offences: normally 6 months but the period can vary 
 Indictable offences: no limit, judges have discretion regarding excessively long delays
There are several special cases, such as tax evasion (10 years) and the use of an unlicensed television set (one year).

Civil cases 

 Breach of contract: 6 years
 Personal injury resulting from negligence, nuisance, or breach of duty: 2 years for adults  and 2 years from 18th birthday for infants 
 Assault: 6 years 
 Actions for the recovery of Land: 12 years
 Defamation: 1 year (may be extended by the Courts to 2 years)
 Maritime: 2 years

Notes
Statute of Limitations, 1957
Statute of Limitations (Amendment) Act, 1991
Statute of Limitations (Amendment) Act, 2000
Defamation Act 2009
 Civil Liability and Courts Act 2004
 Civil Liability Act 1961
 Liability for Defective Products Act 1991

References

Law of the Republic of Ireland
Statutes of limitations
1957 in law
1957 in Ireland